Sepia baxteri is a species of cuttlefish native to the southwestern Pacific Ocean, specifically the waters around Lord Howe Island. It is known only from the type
cuttlebones. Depth range is unknown.

Cuttlebones of this species are known to reach at least 74 mm.

S. baxteri is possibly a junior synonym of Sepia bandensis. The placement of this species in the genus Sepia is also questionable.

The type specimen was collected near Lord Howe Island. It is deposited at the Australian Museum in Sydney.

References

External links

Cuttlefish
Molluscs described in 1940
Taxa named by Tom Iredale